Martin Scicluna may refer to:
Martin Scicluna (footballer) (born 1960), Maltese footballer
Martin Scicluna (businessman), British businessman